Connor Bazelak (born September 22, 2000) is an American football quarterback for Bowling Green. He previously played for the Missouri and the Indiana.

Early life and high school career
Bazelak grew up in Dayton, Ohio and attended Archbishop Alter High School, where he played basketball and football. As a senior, he passed for over 1,500 yards with 13 touchdowns and two interceptions in a triple option offense out of the wishbone formation. Bazelak committed to play college football at Missouri over offers from Georgia, Purdue, North Carolina State, Kentucky and Vanderbilt.

College career

Missouri
Bazelak played in three games as a true freshman, allowing him to use a redshirt and maintain an extra season of NCAA eligibility. He started the final game of the season against Arkansas, but tore his ACL midway through the game. Bazelak completed 15 of 21 passes for 144 yards in his true freshman season.

Bazelak took over at quarterback in each of the Tigers' first two games of his redshirt freshman season before being named the team's starter. Bazelak completed 218 of 324 passes for 2,366 yards and seven touchdowns with six interceptions and was named the SEC co-Freshman of the Year. Bazelak was named to the watchlist for the Davey O'Brien Award going into his redshirt sophomore season. He ended his 2021 season appearing in 11 games with 2,548 yards, 16 touchdowns, and 11 interceptions.

Indiana

After the season, he announced he would be transferring to play for the Indiana Hoosiers. On November 29. 2022, Bazelak announced his decision to enter the transfer portal again.

Bowling Green
On January 13, 2023, Bazelak announced via his personal Twitter that he would be transferring to play for the Bowling Green State University Falcons.

Statistics

Personal life 
Bazelak's father, Len Bazelak, played college basketball at Dartmouth and holds the school's record for career three-point percentage.

References

External links
Missouri Tigers bio

2000 births
Living people
Players of American football from Dayton, Ohio
American football quarterbacks
Missouri Tigers football players
Indiana Hoosiers football players
Bowling Green Falcons football players